Aysgarth Falls are a triple flight of waterfalls, surrounded by woodland and farmland, carved out by the River Ure over an almost  stretch on its descent to mid-Wensleydale in the Yorkshire Dales of England, near the village of Aysgarth. The falls are quite spectacular after heavy rainfall as thousands of gallons of water cascade over the series of broad limestone steps, which are divided into three stages:  Upper Force, Middle Force and Lower Force.

The falls are an SSSI.

Aysgarth Falls have attracted visitors for more than 200 years, including John Ruskin, J. M. W. Turner and William Wordsworth visited, all enthusing about the falls' outstanding beauty. All three falls were featured in the film Robin Hood: Prince of Thieves.

The Falls are situated in the Yorkshire Dales National Park. There is a visitors' centre with an exhibition, information, items for sale, a café, toilets and a pay-and-display car park.

There are public footpaths through the wooded valley, offering views of the river and falls. Wild flowers appear in the spring and summer, for example snowdrops in January and February, primroses in April and bluebells in May, and birds, squirrels and deer may also be seen. Occasionally salmon can be seen leaping up the falls in autumn. Nearby is St Andrew's Church, which has what is reputed to be the largest churchyard in England. The church has a medieval painted wooden screen rescued from the destroyed Jervaulx Abbey.

The name originates from Old Norse and means the open space in the oak trees.

It was featured on the television programme Seven Natural Wonders as one of the wonders of the North.

See also
 List of waterfalls of England

References

Waterfalls of North Yorkshire
Wensleydale